Sixth Five-Year Plan may refer to:

Sixth Five-Year Plan (People's Republic of China)
Sixth Five-Year Plan (Soviet Union)
Sixth Five-Year Plans (Pakistan)

See also
Five-year plan (disambiguation)
Fifth Five-Year Plan (disambiguation)
Seventh Five-Year Plan (disambiguation)